Alejandro Elordi (26 February 1894, date of death unknown) was an Argentine footballer. He played in one match for the Argentina national football team in 1917. He was also part of Argentina's squad for the 1917 South American Championship.

References

External links
 
 

1894 births
Year of death missing
Argentine footballers
Argentina international footballers
Place of birth missing
Association football defenders
Ferro Carril Oeste footballers
Estudiantes de Buenos Aires footballers
San Lorenzo de Almagro footballers
Club Atlético Huracán footballers